Frank Jordan (19 August 1932 – 13 March 2012) was an Australian water polo player. He competed at the 1952 Summer Olympics.

References

1932 births
2012 deaths
Australian male water polo players
Olympic water polo players of Australia
Water polo players at the 1952 Summer Olympics